Kespek may refer to:

 the Mi'kmaq territory of Kespek, called Gespe'gewa'gi locally, (Mi'kmaq: gespe'g, "Last Land"), which is located at the Gaspé Peninsula and western New Brunswick
 the Gaspé Peninsula, or Gespe'g in Mi'kmaq, or Gaspésie in French
 the First Nations (Mi'kmaq) reserve of Gesgapegiag, which is located at the southern shore of the Gaspé Peninsula
 the town of Gaspé, which is located at the northeastern tip of the peninsula